Migen Metani (born 5 May 1989) is an Albanian football player. He currently plays as a midfielder for Tërbuni Puke in the Albanian First Division.

KF Tirana
Metani made his league debut for KF Tirana on 27 September 2008, in a match against KS Flamurtari Vlore, when the 19-year-old midfielder came on for Hat Trick Hero Migen Memelli on the 78th minute. In the 2008–2009 season he made 3 league appearances, all of them as a substitute. He has so far played 37 minutes in the Albanian Superliga.

Teuta Durres
He signed for Teuta Durres on 22 June 2011 after struggling to fight for a place in the KF Tirana squad.

Career statistics

References

1989 births
Living people
Footballers from Tirana
Albanian footballers
Association football midfielders
KF Tirana players
KS Gramozi Ersekë players
KS Kastrioti players
KF Teuta Durrës players
KF Gramshi players
Kategoria Superiore players
Kategoria e Parë players
Kategoria e Dytë players